Aer Lingus Regional is an Aer Lingus brand which has been used for commuter and regional flights.  Aer Lingus Regional scheduled passenger services operate primarily from Ireland to the United Kingdom, France, and the Channel Islands, and also from Belfast, Northern Ireland. Services were operated by Stobart Air until the company informed Aer Lingus in June 2021 that it would no longer be in a position to operate the franchise. The contract for the franchise was then awarded to Emerald Airlines and services have sinced resumed in early 2022.

History

Foundation
The possibility of the brand, and associated operating arrangement were first announced on 6 January 2010, when Aer Lingus hinted to the media that it was interested in expanding its UK services with the help of what was then Aer Arann. It was also mentioned as solely a Cork expansion with no mention of Dublin, with Aer Lingus saying bulk seats would be bought on Aer Arann planes without an actual financial take-over.

On 26 January 2010, it was confirmed that Aer Lingus and Aer Arann would launch a new franchise agreement. On that same date, new routes from Dublin to Doncaster-Sheffield and Durham Tees Valley were announced by Aer Lingus Regional, in addition to a new route from Cork to Glasgow. It was also decided that previous Aer Arann routes to Cork would all be transferred to Aer Lingus Regional. Aer Arann services to Blackpool and Cardiff from Dublin would be transferred to Aer Lingus Regional also.

Operational approach
Though Aer Arann and Aer Lingus founded Aer Lingus Regional together, Aer Arann operated all flights and managed those flights with Aer Arann flight crew on board. All aircraft were painted in Aer Lingus Regional livery, and both airlines anticipated new routes being announced as the new venture between the two airlines grew.

Growth
On 14 March 2012, Aer Arann confirmed that it would streamline all of its own branded services into Aer Lingus Regional, from 25 March 2012. Routes that transferred to Aer Lingus Regional following this included ones from Dublin to the Isle of Man and Kerry, Waterford to London-Luton, London-Southend and Manchester. The airline later suspended all services from Waterford. On 11 July 2012, Aer Arann announced that it intended to purchase 8 ATR 72-600 aircraft to help replace and expand its operations. The first of these aircraft were delivered in late April 2013.

Stobart Air
On 20 March 2014, Aer Arann announced its intention to re-brand and form Stobart Air to allow the company to seek further franchise agreements. There was no change to the operation of Aer Lingus Regional services. On 27 November 2014, Stobart Air was awarded PSO contracts between Dublin-Donegal from 1 February 2015. The existing Dublin-Kerry route was also extended to 2017. On the same date, all services to/from Shannon were confirmed to be axed from 5 January 2015, and the base there closed on the same date. The airline later resumed services to/from Shannon.

In January 2018, the Minister for Transport, Tourism and Sport, Shane Ross, announced that Stobart Air would continue its two PSO routes, Dublin to Donegal and Kerry, until January 2022. That year saw the airline adding an additional 70,000 seats during its winter season, with 580 flights a week.

COVID-19
Due to the COVID-19 pandemic, all international flights were first reduced to a limited schedule and then temporarily suspended from the 28th of March until further notice. The two domestic PSO services continued, to maintain "vital links". Due to the lack of flights, Stobart Air which temporally laid off most of its 400 employees. Only 16% of Stobart Air's workforce would be retained, primarily to operate the domestic Irish routes.

Changes
When he was announcing the end of first quarter results for IAG, Chief Executive Willie Walsh revealed that a different provider might operate the routes once the Stobart Air contract expired at the end of 2022. Aer Lingus Group, together with Stobart Air, announced on 23 July 2020 that it was to establish a base at Belfast–City Airport with 6 new routes to Birmingham, East Midlands, Edinburgh, Exeter, Leeds/Bradford and Manchester with 5 based ATR72-600 aircraft and over 200 weekly flights planned to operate. The news was welcomed by airport and government officials in what was described as "an extremely challenging environment" during the coronavirus pandemic.

Following a competitive tender process, it was announced that Stobart Air had not been successful in retaining the Aer Lingus Regional Franchise. From January 2023 a new operator would take over, with Emerald Airlines as the preferred option.

On 11 June 2021, Stobart Air informed Aer Lingus that it was terminating its franchise agreement, as the company was to be placed into liquidation, resulting in the cancellation of all Aer Lingus Regional flights, affecting 12 routes. Aer Lingus subsequently announced that it would operate five of these routes for the time being, and that BA CityFlyer would operate two for at least a week. The former fleet of ATR planes was placed on the market by Stobart's principal shareholder.

The Irish government sought an airline to operate the two PSO routes on a temporary basis before a new tender for a long-term contract. Emerald Airlines remained the preferred option and, as of July 2021, was expected to launch its services in 2022. Emerald was confirmed as the Aer Lingus Regional franchise operator in August 2021, and on 17 December 2021, its operations under the brand were announced to launch on 17 March 2022. Prior to its planned launch, Emerald was granted a PSO route between Dublin and Donegal, accelerating the brand's relaunch of operations to 26 February 2022.

Destinations

, Aer Lingus Regional operates or has previously operated to the following destinations:

Fleet
 

The Aer Lingus Regional fleet, which is operated by Emerald Airlines, consists of following aircraft :

See also
 List of airlines
 Transport in Ireland

References

External links

 

Companies based in Swords, Dublin
Aer Lingus
Airlines established in 2010
Irish companies established in 2010
Regional airline brands